This is a list of the 72 Members of Parliament (MPs) elected to the House of Commons of the United Kingdom by Scottish constituencies for the Fifty-Third Parliament of the United Kingdom (2001 to 2005) at the 2001 United Kingdom general election.

Composition

List

See also 

 Lists of MPs for constituencies in Scotland

Lists of UK MPs 2001–2005
Lists of MPs for constituencies in Scotland